Shvedov is a Russian masculine surname, its feminine counterpart is Shvedova. The surname is derived from the word швед (shved, meaning "a Swedish person") and literally means Swede's. It may refer to:

 Alexandr Shvedov (born 1973), Kazakhstani water polo goalkeeper
 Anastasiya Shvedova (born 1979), Belarusian, formerly Russian, pole vaulter
 Grigory Shvedov (born 1976), Russian human rights activist and journalist
 Natalia Shvedova (1916–2009), Russian lexicographer
 Yaroslava Shvedova (born 1987), Kazakhstani tennis player of Russian origin

Russian-language surnames